

C 

 Cairo Land (Cairo, Egypt)
 Calaway Park (Calgary, Alberta, Canada)
 California's Great America (Santa Clara, California, United States)
 Camden Park (Huntington, West Virginia, United States)
 Camelot Park (Bogotá, Cundinamarca, Colombia)
 Camelot Theme Park (Chorley, Lancashire, England)
 Canada's Wonderland (Vaughan, Ontario, Canada)
 Canadian National Exhibition (Toronto, Ontario, Canada)
 Canobie Lake Park (Salem, New Hampshire, United States)
 Carolina Adventure World (Winnsboro, South Carolina, United States)
 Carosello (Sottomarina di Chioggia, Friuli-Venezia Giulia, Italy)
 Carousel Park Adventure Island (Bridlington, East Riding of Yorkshire, England)
 Carowinds (Fort Mill, South Carolina, United States)
 Carolina Harbor (Charlotte, North Carolina, United States)
 Cascade Park (New Castle, Pennsylvania, United States)
 Casino Pier (Seaside Heights, New Jersey, United States)
 Castle Park (Riverside, California, United States)
 Castle Park (Dhahran, Dhahran, Saudi Arabia)
 Castles N' Coasters (Phoenix, Arizona, United States)
 CarthageLand (Yasmine, Hammamet, Tunisia)
 Cavallino Matto (Livorno, Tuscany, Italy)
 Cedar Point (Sandusky, Ohio, United States)
 Cedar Point Shores (Sandusky, Ohio, United States)
 Celebration City (Branson, Missouri, United States)
 Celebration Station (Baton Rouge, Louisiana, United States)
 Celebration Station (Clearwater, Florida, United States)
 Celebration Station (Greensboro, North Carolina, United States)
 Celebration Station (Mesquite, Texas, United States)
 Celebration Station (Tulsa, Oklahoma, United States)
 Centreville Amusement Park (Toronto, Ontario, Canada)
 CentrO.Park (Oberhausen, North Rhine-Westphalia, Germany)
 Chakazoolu Indoor Theme Park (Sanabis, Bahrain)
 Chariots Entertainment World (Johannesburg, Gauteng, South Africa)
 Charleston's Wonder World (Charleston, South Carolina, United States)
 Chengdu Amusement Park (Chengdu, Sichuan, China)
 Cherokee Fun Park (Cherokee, North Carolina, United States)
 Cherry Valley Golf & Games (Rockford, Illinois, United States)
 Chessington World of Adventures (Chessington, London, England)
 Chiaksan Dreamland (Wonju-si, Gangwon-do, South Korea)
 Chiba Zoo Dream World (Chiba, Chiba, Japan)
 Chicolandia (Barquisimeto, Lara, Venezuela)
 Children's Grand Park (Songdong-Gu, Seoul, South Korea)
 Chime Long Paradise (Guangzhou, Guangdong, China
 Chippewa Park (Thunder Bay, Ontario, Canada)
 Chongqing Amusement Park (Chongqing, China)
 Churpfalzpark (Loifling, Bavaria, Germany)
 Cidade da Criança (São Bernardo do Campo, São Paulo state, Brazil)
 Cigoland (Kintzheim, Alsace, France)
 Cirque du Soleil Theme Park Resort, (Nuevo Vallarta, Mexico)
 City of Miami PBA (Miami, Florida, United States)
 City Park Carousel Gardens (New Orleans, Louisiana, United States)
 Clacton Pier (Clacton-on-sea, Essex, England)
 Clarence Pier (Portsmouth, Hampshire, England)
 Clementon Amusement Park (Clementon, New Jersey, United States)
 Cliff's Amusement Park (Albuquerque, New Mexico, United States)
 Cobra Adventure Park (Panama City Beach, Florida, United States)
 Codonas Amusement Park (Aberdeen, Grampian, Scotland)
 Colombian National Coffee Park (Montenegro, Quindío, Colombia)
 Como Town (St. Paul, Minnesota, United States)
 Coney Beach Pleasure Park (Porthcawl, Mid Glamorgan, Wales)
 Coney Island (Cincinnati, Ohio, United States)
 Coney Island - Independent Vendor 1 (Brooklyn, New York, United States)
 Coney Island - Independent Vendor 2 (Brooklyn, New York, United States)
 Coney Island - Kaufman - East (Brooklyn, New York, United States)
 Coney Island - Kaufman - West (Brooklyn, New York, United States)
 Coney Park (Lima, Peru)
 Conneaut Lake Park (Conneaut Lake, Pennsylvania, United States)
 Cosmo Land (Yokohama, Japan)
 Cosmo's World (Kuala Lumpur, Malaysia)
 Country Fair Entertainment Park (Medford, New York, United States)
 Crab Island (Beijing, China)
 Craig Tara Holiday Park (Ayr, Strathclyde, Scotland)
 Crown Cave (Guilin, Guangxi, China)
 Cultus Lake Adventure Park (Chilliwack, British Columbia, Canada)
 Cypress Gardens (Winter Haven, Florida, United States)

D 
 Daminghu (Jinan, Shandong, China)
 Dazzeland (Adelaide, South Australia, Australia)
 DelGrosso's Amusement Park (Tipton, Pennsylvania, United States)
 Della Adventure Park (Kunegaon, Lonavala, India)
 Dennlys Parc (Dennebrœucq, Nord-Pas de Calais, France)
 Deno's Wonder Wheel Amusement Park (Brooklyn, New York, United States)
 Devon Cliffs (Exmouth, Devon, England)
 Didiland (Morsbronn-les-Bains, Alsace, France)
 Dinorex (Arlington Heights, Illinois, United States)
 Dinorex (Crystal Lake, Illinois, United States)
 Dinotropolis (Caracas, Distrito Federal, Venezuela)
 DippieDoe Familiepark (Eindhoven, North Brabant, Netherlands)
 Discovery World (Houli Hsiang, Taichung, Taiwan)
 Discovery Cove (Orlando, Florida, United States)
 Disney's Blizzard Beach (Orlando, Florida, United States)
 Disney's Typhoon Lagoon (Orlando, Florida, United States)
 Disneyland Resort (Anaheim, California, United States)
 Disneyland
 Disney California Adventure
 Disneyland Paris (Marne-la-Vallée, Île-de-France, France)
 Disneyland Park 
 Walt Disney Studios Park 
 Diverland (Pampatar, Nueva Esparta, Venezuela)
 Divertido (Mexico City, Distrito Federal, Mexico)
 Divertilandia (Barquisimeto, Lara, Venezuela)
 Divo Ostrov, St Petersberg
 Dixie Landin' and Blue Bayou (Baton Rouge, Louisiana, United States)
 Djurs Sommerland (Nimtofte, Jylland, Denmark)
 Dollywood (Pigeon Forge, Tennessee, United States)
 Dollywood's Splash Country (Pigeon Forge, Tennessee, United States)
 Don Quijote (Roppongi, Minato, Tokyo, Japan)
 Dongfang Amusement Park (Guangzhou, Guangdong, China)
 Donghu Park (Shenzhen, Guangdong, China)
 Doocoland (Yongin-si, Gyeonggi-do, South Korea)
 Dorney Park & Wildwater Kingdom (Allentown, Pennsylvania, United States)
 Dover Lake Waterpark (Sagamore Hills, Ohio, United States)
 Dowdy's (Nags Head, North Carolina, United States)
 Downunderland (Canberra, Australian Capital Territory, Australia)
 Dracula's Cabaret Restaurant (Broadbeach Waters, Queensland, Australia)
 Dragon Centre (Hong Kong, Hong Kong, China)
 Dragon World (Kathmandu, Nepal)
 Drayton Manor Theme Park (Drayton Bassett, Staffordshire, England)
 Dream Park (Cairo, Egypt)
 Dream World, Bangkok, Thailand)
 Dreamland (Koriyama, Fukushima, Japan)
 Dreamland (Margate, Kent, England)
 Dreamland (Seoul, South Korea)
 Dreamworld (Coomera, Queensland, Australia)
 DreamWorks Water Park (East Rutherford, New Jersey, United States)
 Drievliet Family Park (Rijswijk, South Holland, Netherlands)
 Drouwenerzand Attractiepark (Drouwen, Drenthe, Netherlands)
 Duinrell (Wassenaar, South Holland, Netherlands)
 Dunes Leisure (Mablethorpe, Lincolnshire, England)
 Dunia Fantasi (Jakarta, Indonesia)
 Dutch Wonderland (Lancaster, Pennsylvania, United States)

C

nl:Lijst van attractieparken (C-D)